Selishten Dol is a village in Southern Bulgaria. The village is located in Pernik Municipality, Pernik Province. Аccording to the numbers provided by the 2020 Bulgarian census, Selishten Dol currently has a population of 119 people with a permanent address registration in the settlement.

Geography 
Selishten Dol village is located in Municipality Pernik, 14 kilometers away west from Pernik and 46 kilometers away from Sofia, the capital of Bulgaria. The neighboring villages are Velkovtsi, Solitsa, Slakovtsi, Noevtsi, Yardzhilovtsi, and Plilula.

Selishten Dol lies in a continental climate area with a harsh winter and a warm summer. There is a river that passes through the village until July, and during the summer dries up. The rain is less than the average for Bulgaria.

History 
The first written text that confirms the existence of the village in the Middle Ages dates back to 1576. The name of the village stems from a story that says that Selishten Dol burned down to the ground and was rebuilt on a lower location. Hence the name “Dol” which means down.

After the establishment of the mines in Pernik, a large portion of the male population from the village starts work there.

Buildings 

 The local school was established in 1883 and used various houses of local villages until a school edifice was built in 1910.
 The local community hall and library “Hristo Botev” was built in 1928.

Ethnicity 
According to the Bulgarian population census in 2011.

References 

Villages in Pernik Province